El Rincón may refer to:
El Rincón, Mexico
El Rincón, Herrera, Panama
El Rincón, Veraguas, Panama